Yongsan Dreamhub (also known as the Yongsan International Business District) is a 28 – 31 trillion-won ($22.6 – $27 billion) project that was planned to be built on the banks of the Han River near Yongsan Station at the  area of the Yongsan District, central Seoul, South Korea.

Background
The Yongsan District is a relatively large area of the megalopolis of Seoul that is seen as not significantly developed. It is a site of the American Yongsan Garrison which covers 16% of the district. The development proposal aimed to turn it into a modern sprawl of offices, malls, hotels and apartments, hoping to create a new signature district of Korea.

History
The project's main developers included the South Korean public transport company, Korail, which owns some underused land in Yongsan. In total, about 29 corporations, backed up the South Korean government, were involved in the project.

Another of the designs for twin tower skyscraper known as The Cloud unveiled and quickly scrapped in 2011 caused a controversy over a similarity to "the World Trade Center buildings exploding as they were hit by planes on 9/11".

The project was first proposed in 2006, and was described as Korea’s largest and most ambitious property development project. Financing difficulties delayed it following the Financial crisis of 2007–2008. The Korean real estate market also did not seem appealing to the investors. In subsequent years, a growing number of companies, such as Samsung, have pulled out of the project. The project has been finally cancelled in April 2013. It is possible the venture will result in a number of bankruptcies. There are also speculations about a possible class-action lawsuit by the residents against the developers and the government.

See also
 List of tallest buildings in Seoul

References

External links
 'The logic of this story is the logic of a Dream Hub... or a nightmare'

Yongsan District
Cancelled projects